Gilbertiodendron robynsianum is a species of plant in the family Fabaceae. It is found only in the Ivory Coast. It is threatened by habitat loss.

References

robynsianum
Endemic flora of Ivory Coast
Vulnerable flora of Africa
Taxa named by François Pellegrin
Taxa named by André Aubréville
Taxonomy articles created by Polbot